Ratu Kiniviliame Taukeinikoro is a Fijian Chief and former political leader.  From 2001 to 2006, he represented the Province of Namosi in the Senate as one of fourteen nominees of the Great Council of Chiefs.  He was a member of the Joint Sector Committee on Economic Services.

In the parliamentary election of 1999, he was an unsuccessful candidate of the Soqosoqo ni Vakavulewa ni Taukei (SVT) for the Namosi Fijian Communal Constituency in the House of Representatives.

References

I-Taukei Fijian members of the Senate (Fiji)
Living people
Soqosoqo ni Vakavulewa ni Taukei politicians
Fijian chiefs
Politicians from Namosi Province
Year of birth missing (living people)